Liješće is a village in the municipality of Brod, Republika Srpska, Bosnia and Herzegovina. This village is about 400 years old. About 2000 people live there. The most famous families in the Lijesce are Jelic and Sukurma.

References

Villages in Republika Srpska
Populated places in Brod, Bosnia and Herzegovina